The Pension Schemes Act 1993 (c 48) is a United Kingdom Act of Parliament that concerns the administration of occupational pensions.

Background
The Pension Schemes Act 1993 was the first statute to result from the comprehensive inquiry led by Roy Goode resulting in the command paper, Pension Law Reform.

Contents
Part I contains section 1 that sets out the three pillars, or categories of UK pensions: occupational pensions, personal or private pensions and the public or state pension.

Part II concerned administration of the pension system under an "Occupational Pensions Board", though this has now been replaced by the Pensions Regulator under the Pensions Act 2004.

Part III in sections 7 to 68 concerns the certification of pension schemes, and the rule that people with entitlement to such schemes get reduced state benefits, and other effects.

Part IV in sections 69 to 101 sets out minimum protection for early leavers from their jobs before an entitlement to an occupational pension arises.

Part V in sections 102 to 110 requires that pension schemes contain annual increases in line with prices, though sections 102 to 108 were soon replaced by the Pensions Act 1995.

Part VI in sections 111 to 118 contains further protections for scheme members regarding voluntary contributions and disclosure.

Part VII, in sections 119 to 128, set out the rules for insolvent schemes and the duty of the Secretary of State to reimburse employees, but was then replaced by the Pensions Act 1995..

Part VIII contains rules on the relationship between requirements of the Act and scheme rules, insofar as they are overridden by the Act. Part IX relates to how scheme trust deeds can be modified. Part X relates to investigations by the Pensions Ombudsman. Part X contains miscellaneous provisions, and Part XII holds supplementary provisions.

See also
UK labour law
Pensions in the United Kingdom
Pensions Act 1995
Pensions Act 2004
Pensions Act 2008

Notes

External links
Association of Member-Directed Pension Schemes (AMPS) - The principal body for discussing changes involved in the area of pension planning.

Pensions in the United Kingdom
United Kingdom Acts of Parliament 1993